The Royal Society Science Books Prize is an annual £25,000 prize awarded by the Royal Society to celebrate outstanding popular science books from around the world. It is open to authors of science books written for a non-specialist audience, and since it was established in 1988 has championed writers such as Stephen Hawking, Jared Diamond, Stephen Jay Gould and Bill Bryson. In 2015 The Guardian described the prize as "the most prestigious science book prize in Britain".

History
The Royal Society established the Science Books Prize in 1988 with the aim of encouraging the writing, publishing and reading of good and accessible popular science books. Its name has varied according to sponsorship agreements.

Judging process

A panel of judges decides the shortlist and the winner of the Prize each year. The panel is chaired by a fellow of the Royal Society and includes authors, scientists and media personalities. The judges for the 2016 prize included author Bill Bryson, theoretical physicist Dr Clare Burrage, science fiction author Alastair Reynolds, ornithologist and science blogger GrrlScientist, and author and director of external affairs at the Science Museum Group, Roger Highfield. In 2019, the jury consisted of Sir Nigel Shadbolt, Shukry James Habib, Dorothy Koomson, Stephen McGann, and Gwyneth Williams.

All books entered for the prize must be published in English for the first time between September and October the preceding year. The winner is announced at an award ceremony and receives £25,000. Each of the other shortlisted authors receives £2,500.

Shortlisted books

Before 2000

2000s

2010s

2020s

References

External links
 The Royal Society Insight Investment Science Book Prize
 Royal Society Prize at lovethebook

British children's literary awards
Sanofi
Royal Society
Science writing awards
British science and technology awards
Awards established in 1988
1988 establishments in the United Kingdom
Annual events in the United Kingdom
British non-fiction literary awards